Gordon Neate (14 March 1941 – May 2019) was an English professional footballer who played as a full back.

Career
Born in Reading, Neate joined hometown club Reading in 1956 at the age of 15, turned professional in March 1958, and made his senior debut in April 1959. Whilst at Reading he was nicknamed "Fred" by teammate Maurice Evans. After making 99 league appearances for the club, he retired due to injury in 1966, aged 25. He then worked for the club as groundsman until he retired in 2009, aged 68, after 53 years with the club as both player and staff.

References

1941 births
2019 deaths
English footballers
Reading F.C. players
English Football League players
Association football fullbacks
Reading F.C. non-playing staff